House of Sand and Fog   is the original soundtrack album, on the Varèse Sarabande label, of the 2003 Academy Award and Golden Globe-nominated film House of Sand and Fog starring Jennifer Connelly, Ben Kingsley, Shohreh Aghdashloo and Ron Eldard. The original score was composed by James Horner.

The album was nominated for the Academy Award for Best Original Score.

Track listing

References

External links 
House of Sand and Fog Soundtrack Review in BBC
House Of Sand And Fog; 2003 Academy Award nominee for Best Original Score
House of Sand and Fog (James Horner) Soundtrack Review
Filmtracks: House of Sand and Fog (James Horner)

Drama film soundtracks
James Horner albums
2003 soundtrack albums